Casarini is a surname. Notable people with the surname include:

Andrea Casarini (born 1994), Italian footballer
Federico Casarini (born 1989), Italian footballer
Luca Casarini, Italian activist
Camillo Casarini (1830-1874), Italian politician

See also
6364 Casarini, main-belt asteroid